Peter Lind (born 1961) is a Danish photographer, Contemporary artist and New Media Art artist.
Peter Lind's work is based on documentary observations, and stands at the crossroads of conceptual photography, installation and Narrative structure.
He has been exhibited in :  Austria, Australia, Argentina, Denmark, France, Germany, Greece, USA, Italy, Spain, Poland, Sweden, Vietnam.

Lind was born in Copenhagen.  He studied cinematography at the Istituto di Scienze Cinematografiche e Audiovisive in Florence, 1983, and University of Copenhagen 1984.
His work is permanently represented in several public collections: Brandts Museum of Photographic Art, National Museum of Photography, The Danish Art Foundation (Statens Kunstfond) Esbjerg Art Museum.

Publications
 Film city. Catalogue of an exhibition held at Greenaway Art Gallery, 3–28 February 1999.
 The Royal Library Denmark − CD-ROM: From here to here to there to there to here 2001
  The cat lab, by Peter Lind: Documentation of the exhibition, 27. May – 2. July 2016.  
 Reverse collection. 2018

Further reading
Peter Lind: Reverse Collection Dagbladet Information FOTOBLOGGEN by Jens Christoffersen 2012
KATALOG – Journal of Photography & Video vol. 27, no. 1 2016, "Reverse Engineering the Archive – Peter Lind’s archival projects" by Peter Alexander van der Meijden.

References 
 Database of artworks in Danish state-owned and state-subsidised museums (inaccurate and not up-dated)
 Database of artworks in Danish state-owned and state-subsidised museums (inaccurate and not up-dated)

External links 
 Artist's website
 Nordic Embassies Berlin

1961 births
Living people
Danish contemporary artists
New media artists
Danish experimental filmmakers
Danish photographers
20th-century Danish photographers
21st-century Danish photographers
Photographers from Copenhagen